The 2001 NBA Finals was the championship round of the National Basketball Association (NBA)'s 2000–01 season. The defending NBA champion and Western Conference champion Los Angeles Lakers took on the Eastern Conference champion Philadelphia 76ers for the championship, with the Lakers holding home-court advantage in a best-of-seven format.

The Lakers won the series 4 games to 1. Lakers center Shaquille O'Neal was named the Most Valuable Player of the series.

NBA MVP Allen Iverson scored 48 points in his only NBA Finals victory, as the 76ers took Game 1 107–101 in overtime, handing the Lakers their only loss of the playoffs. However, the Lakers went on to win the next four games. In Game 3 Robert Horry hit a three-point shot in the last minute, and in the next two games the Lakers used hot 3-point shooting to build big leads and hold off late 76ers comeback attempts in games 4 and 5, pulling away for double-digit wins to win the title.

Background

The Los Angeles Lakers entered the 2000–01 NBA season as the defending NBA champions. The club lost a few players to free agency, but they signed veteran players like Isaiah Rider and Horace Grant. The Lakers began the season struggling on and off the court, as they were losing games at the beginning with the Shaq–Kobe feud. Injuries also riddled the team as they struggled through the season. But by April 1, 2001, the Lakers last loss was to the New York Knicks and they never looked back as the team closed out the season on an eight-game winning streak, thus finishing the season 56-26 and closing out as the number 2 seed in the West behind the San Antonio Spurs.

The Lakers began the 2001 NBA Playoffs versus the team against whom they played the previous year in the Western Conference finals, the Portland Trail Blazers. The Trail Blazers were a team that struggled throughout the season but battled back to claim the 7th seed. The series wasn't close, as the Lakers swept the Trail Blazers by double digits in all three games. In the semifinals the Lakers took on the Sacramento Kings, a team who had also given the Lakers a tough series the previous season, but the Lakers took two close games at home and went to Sacramento to finish the Kings off with a 4–0 sweep as well. In the conference finals the Lakers went up against the number 1 seed San Antonio Spurs, who were expected to be more competitive than the Lakers' previous opponents. But the Lakers took games 1 and 2 in San Antonio, and then blew them out in games 3 and 4 in Los Angeles in another complete sweep as they became the second team in NBA history to sweep the conference playoffs at 11–0, the 1988-1989 Los Angeles Lakers being the first.

But the Lakers met a snag on their quest to the first NBA sweep in playoff history as they went up against Allen Iverson and the Philadelphia 76ers. The 76ers, seeded number 1 in the Eastern Conference, had just come out of two straight seven-game series against the Toronto Raptors and Milwaukee Bucks. During the first game, the trio of Iverson, Dikembe Mutombo and Eric Snow, coming hot off a long Eastern Conference championship road, beat the Lakers in overtime, showcasing their endurance.

The Lakers then took Game 2. Afterwards, Kobe Bryant was quoted as saying he was coming to Philadelphia to cut their hearts out. The Sixers dropped all three games in Philadelphia, giving the Lakers their second straight championship.

Road to the Finals

Regular season series

Both teams split the two meetings, each won by the home team:

2001 NBA Finals rosters

Los Angeles Lakers

Philadelphia 76ers

Series summary

Game summaries

Game 1 

The Lakers dominated early, in what looked like to be their fourth series sweep. Scoring 16 straight points, the Lakers took a 21–9 lead over the Allen Iverson-led 76ers. Despite this major lead, Iverson began dominating at the half of the 2nd quarter scoring 30 first half points. The 76ers turned the game around and even went up by 15 points during the third quarter before the Lakers started a comeback. Shaquille O'Neal was a major factor in the comeback, scoring 18 points in the quarter.

The Lakers played fantastically during the 4th quarter, and Tyronn Lue came off the bench and limited Iverson to merely 3 points and had 3 assists and 2 steals of his own. The game was eventually tied at 94, and when Dikembe Mutombo missed two free throws and Eric Snow's desperation three-pointer at the buzzer bounced off the rim, the game went to overtime.

The Lakers scored the first 5 points in the first half of overtime. Raja Bell then hit a tough layup to answer, followed by Iverson scoring 7 straight points, including a three pointer to give them the lead. Iverson followed up with a step back 2-pointer over Lue which is famously known as he stepped over Lue after hitting the shot. The 76ers finished with a 6 point win to take the first game of the series.

Game 2

Kobe Bryant started off the game with 12 points in the first quarter, while Shaq scored 12 points in the second quarter. Despite their points, the 76ers kept a close lead as Larry Brown ran over 10 plays searching for the right quartet, and the fact that all the Lakers besides Bryant and O'Neal were shooting only at 27%. The Sixers were down by 13 in the fourth quarter, and were making a comeback due to Shaq sitting out with 5 fouls, which helped the 76ers to score 7 straight. Even though the 76ers were within 3 points of the Lakers, the 6 of 16 foul shooting in the fourth quarter put them behind permanently. O'Neal finished with 28 points, 20 rebounds, nine assists, and eight blocks, coming close to a quadruple double. Before the game, Lakers coach Phil Jackson had growled at O'Neal, "Don't be afraid to block a shot!" after O'Neal failed to block a shot in Game 1.

Game 3

Game 4

Game 5

Player statistics

Los Angeles Lakers

|-
| align="left" |  || 5 || 5 || 46.8 || .415 || .333 || .842 || 7.8 || 5.8 || 1.4 || 1.4 || 24.6 
|-
| align="left" |  || 5 || 5 || 31.6 || .436 || .526 || .833 || 1.2 || 2.0 || 1.6 || 0.2 || 9.8 
|-
| align="left" |  || 5 || 5 || 32.8 || .441 || .467 || .923 || 4.6 || 3.8 || 1.2 || 0.4 || 9.8 
|-
| align="left" |  || 5 || 5 || 24.6 || .294 || .000 || .750 || 5.6 || 0.6 || 0.4 || 1.4 || 5.2 
|-
| align="left" |  || 3 || 0 || 8.3 || .625 || .333 || .667 || 1.7 || 1.0 || 0.3 || 0.3 || 4.3 
|-
| align="left" |  || 5 || 0 || 25.4 || .560 || .615 || 1.000 || 5.0 || 1.2 || 0.8 || 1.4 || 8.4 
|-
| align="left" |  || 5 || 0 || 14.6 || .583 || .667 || .000 || 0.8 || 1.4 || 1.4 || 0.2 || 3.6 
|-
| align="left" |  || 2 || 0 || 1.5 || .000 || .000 || .000 || 0.5 || 0.0 || 0.0 || 0.5 || 0.0
|-! style="background:#FDE910;"
| align="left" |  || 5 || 5 || 45.0 || .573 || .000 || .513 || 15.8 || 4.8 || 0.4 || 3.4 || 33.0 
|-
| align="left" |  || 5 || 0 || 18.6 || .300 || .300 || .600 || 3.2 || 2.8 || 0.8 || 0.0 || 3.6 

Philadelphia 76ers

|-
| align="left" |  || 5 || 0 || 15.8 || .308 || .000 || .500 || 1.8 || 0.8 || 2.0 || 0.0 || 2.6 
|-
| align="left" |  || 3 || 0 || 4.3 || .167 || .000 || .000 || 2.0 || 0.0 || 0.0 || 0.0 || 0.7 
|-
| align="left" |  || 5 || 0 || 10.8 || .667 || .000 || 1.000 || 1.0 || 0.4 || 0.2 || 0.0 || 5.2 
|-
| align="left" |  || 5 || 5 || 28.2 || .394 || .000 || .778 || 6.6 || 0.4 || 0.0 || 1.2 || 6.6 
|-
| align="left" |  || 5 || 5 || 47.4 || .407 || .282 || .729 || 5.6 || 3.8 || 1.8 || 0.2 || 35.6 
|-
| align="left" |  || 5 || 4 || 12.4 || .400 || .500 || .000 || 2.0 || 0.2 || 0.2 || 0.4 || 2.0 
|-
| align="left" |  || 2 || 0 || 7.0 || .333 || .000 || .000 || 2.5 || 0.5 || 1.0 || 0.0 || 1.0 
|-
| align="left" |  || 5 || 0 || 6.2 || .417 || .000 || .750 || 1.4 || 0.0 || 0.0 || 0.0 || 2.6 
|-
| align="left" |  || 5 || 5 || 41.4 || .313 || .444 || .667 || 5.4 || 6.0 || 1.2 || 0.6 || 8.0 
|-
| align="left" |  || 5 || 5 || 41.6 || .600 || .000 || .692 || 12.2 || 0.4 || 0.4 || 2.2 || 16.8 
|-
| align="left" |  || 5 || 0 || 3.0 || .333 || .000 || 1.000 || 0.2 || 0.2 || 0.0 || 0.0 || 1.0 
|-
| align="left" |  || 5 || 1 || 32.8 || .407 || .000 || .731 || 4.4 || 6.0 || 1.6 || 0.2 || 12.6

Broadcasting
The 2001 NBA Finals was aired in the United States on NBC, with Marv Albert and Doug Collins on play-by-play and color commentary respectively. Albert also began working for TNT during this period, a role he continued until 2021. Collins departed NBC following the series to serve as head coach of the Washington Wizards.

Ahmad Rashad served as the studio host in place of Hannah Storm, who took a maternity leave during the finals. Kevin Johnson and P. J. Carlesimo served as studio analysts, while Lewis Johnson and Jim Gray served as sideline reporters.

Aftermath
The Lakers won their third straight championship in a four-game sweep of the New Jersey Nets the following year. The Lakers won 58 games in the season, then defeated the Portland Trail Blazers in three games, the San Antonio Spurs in five games, and the Sacramento Kings in seven games before sweeping the Nets in the Finals.

, the series remains the 76ers’ last NBA Finals appearance. The Sixers would win only 43 games in the 2001-02 NBA season, as injuries were the story of their season. Nevertheless, they made the playoffs as the sixth seed, but were defeated by the Boston Celtics in five games. The Celtics themselves came within two games of returning to the NBA Finals for the first time since , but were ousted by the upstart Nets, who made the NBA Finals for the first time, denying a possible Celtics-Lakers final. As for the Sixers, they would never challenge for the title again in the Allen Iverson era, with the team reaching the playoffs only twice for the next four years, winning only one series.

Larry Brown later coached the Detroit Pistons to their third championship in the 2004 NBA Finals, defeating the Lakers 4–1.

References

External links

 entry about Finals at NBA Encyclopedia
2001 NBA Finals at basketball-reference.com

National Basketball Association Finals
Finals
NBA
NBA
2001 in sports in California
2001 in sports in Pennsylvania
2001 in Los Angeles
2001 in Philadelphia
June 2001 sports events in the United States
Basketball competitions in Philadelphia
Basketball competitions in Los Angeles